Michael Richard Delgado de Oliveira (born 12 March 1996), simply known as Michael, is a Brazilian footballer who plays for Al Hilal as a forward.

Club career

Early career
Born in Poxoréu, Mato Grosso, Michael started his career with hometown side Escolinha Diamante Verde. In 2012 he moved to Goiânia, having failed trials at Atlético Goianiense, Goiás, Vila Nova and Goiânia.

In 2015, after spending a period representing amateur side Euro Brasil, Michael joined Monte Cristo in the third division of the Campeonato Goiano. He made his senior debut on 29 August of that year, starting in a 0–5 away loss against Caldas.

In 2016 Michael signed a contract with Goiânia; initially assigned to the under-20s, he was promoted to the first team ahead of the year's second division of the Campeonato Goiano. He scored his first senior goal on 14 August, netting the game's only in a home success over Evangélica.

On 26 December 2016, Michael joined Goianésia in the state league first division. A regular starter, he scored a hat-trick in a 5–1 home routing of Vila Nova the following 12 March.

Goiás

On 13 April 2017, after being named the breakthrough player of the 2017 Goianão, Michael was presented at Goiás. He made his debut for the club on 13 May, coming on as a half-time substitute for Jean Carlos in a 1–0 home defeat to Figueirense for the Série B championship.

Michael scored his first professional goal on 7 July 2017, netting his team's second in a 3–1 home win against Luverdense. He was mainly utilized as a substitute during his first season, as his side narrowly avoided relegation.

Michael became a regular starter during the 2018 campaign, contributing with seven goals in 33 appearances as his side achieved promotion to Série A. He made his top tier debut on 28 April 2019, starting in a 1–0 away defeat of Fluminense.

Michael scored his first goal in the first division on 5 May 2019, but in a 2–1 loss at Cruzeiro. During the months of October and November, he scored six goals in 12 appearances.

Flamengo
On 10 January 2020, Goiás announced the transfer of Michael to Flamengo for a fee of €7.5 million.

Career statistics

Honours

Club
Goiás
 Campeonato Goiano: 2018

Flamengo
 Recopa Sudamericana: 2020
 Campeonato Brasileiro Série A: 2020
 Supercopa do Brasil: 2020, 2021
 Campeonato Carioca: 2020, 2021

Al-Hilal
 Saudi Professional League: 2021–22

Individual
Campeonato Brasileiro Série A Best Newcomer: 2019
Bola de Prata Best Newcomer: 2019
Campeonato Brasileiro Série A Team of the Year: 2021

References

External links
Goiás EC profile 

1996 births
Living people
Sportspeople from Mato Grosso
Brazilian footballers
Association football forwards
Campeonato Brasileiro Série A players
Campeonato Brasileiro Série B players
Saudi Professional League players
Goiânia Esporte Clube players
Goianésia Esporte Clube players
Goiás Esporte Clube players
CR Flamengo footballers
Al Hilal SFC players
Brazilian expatriate footballers
Expatriate footballers in Saudi Arabia
Brazilian expatriate sportspeople in Saudi Arabia